Einer spinnt immer is a 1971 Austrian / West German film directed by Franz Antel.

Plot summary

Cast 
Georg Thomalla as Hugo Haase
Teri Tordai as Clarisse
Uwe Friedrichsen as Uwe Falk
Elfie Pertramer as Beate Haase
Brigitte Grothum as Liane
Eva Basch as Grit Haase
Ralf Wolter as Notar
Jacques Herlin as Dr. Klemm
Gunther Philipp as Major Waldemar
Herbert Fux as Ganove
Paula Elges as Frau Huber
Ossi Wanka as Boy
Marika Kilius as herself (guest appearance)
Hans-Jürgen Bäumler as himself
Carlo Böhm as Neubauer
Erich Kleiber as Ganove
Gerhard Steffen
Franz Muxeneder as Bahnwärter
Otto Ambros as Supermarktmanager

Soundtrack

External links 

1971 films
1971 comedy films
Austrian comedy films
German comedy films
West German films
1970s German-language films
Films directed by Franz Antel
Films scored by Gerhard Heinz
1970s German films